The Dachen Islands, Tachen Islands or Tachens  are a group of islands off the coast of Taizhou, Zhejiang, China, in the East China Sea. They are administered by the Jiaojiang District of Taizhou. Before the First Taiwan Strait Crisis in 1955, the islands were administered by the Republic of China (ROC).

History

ROC evacuation
Until 1955, the Dachen (Tachen) Islands were administered by the Republic of China (ROC), the government of which had been based in Taiwan ( south of the Dachen Islands) since major fighting ceased in the Chinese Civil War. As the People's Liberation Army advanced through Fujian Province in the late 1940s, the U.S.-supported Nationalist forces under Chiang Kai-shek's Kuomintang retreated to China’s offshore Islands. On 20 January 1955, the PLA's conquest of Yijiangshan led to the First Taiwan Strait Crisis. The Formosa Resolution of 1955 passed in Congress nine days later in the United States, leading to the orderly evacuation (Operation Pullback) of the Dachen Islands by the United States Navy in February. At the time, they served as the temporary capital of the Chekiang Province in exile. The U.S. Seventh Fleet used 132 boats and 400 aircraft to move 14,500 civilians, 10,000 Republic of China servicemen and 4,000 guerrilla fighters, along with 40,000 tons of military equipment and supplies from the island. Three days after the evacuation, the islands were taken by the People’s Liberation Army. Chiang Kai-shek grudgingly allowed the island to fall to the Communists so that the other offshore island groups, Kinmen and Matsu, could be successfully defended.

The civilian population of the islands was resettled in mostly Yilan County, Taiwan, but also in other urban areas in Taiwan.

Many of those evacuated to Taiwan later moved to the United States as they lacked strong social networks and access to opportunity in Taiwan. Chefs from the Dachen Islands had a strong influence on American Chinese food.

Geography and Climate 
The islands are located in the Gulf of Taizhou, off the coast of Zhejiang, the People's Republic of China. Dachen Archipelago  consists of a total  of 29 islands, islets, and rocks, totaling .

The fishing industry had long been the backbone of the local economy and the region was one of the largest of the Chinese class II fisheries.  However, after decades of over fishing, the natural resources were depleted and as a result, most of the local population was forced to migrate to the mainland in the late-1980s and the local populace experienced a drastic decrease to a fraction of what it once was.  To compensate for the depletion of natural resources, aquaculture has become prosperous and the archipelago is currently one of the largest aquaculture bases in the region.  However, due to the adaptation of advanced technology which significantly reduced the need of manual labor, the local population has not recovered to its peak level despite the income generated has already been higher than that of the traditional fishery peak in the past, and in fact, the current local population was not much higher than the lowest point in the late-1980s.

To diversify the local economy, tourism had become another major source of income. The forest coverage rate is greater than 56% and it is the provincial level forest park. Due to the forces of nature such as that of tides and winds, there are many spectacular sceneries and the archipelago is called the Chinese Number One Oceanic Penjing (Zhong-Guo Di-Yi Hai-Shang Penjing, 中国第一海上盆景). Another tourist attraction was the military fortifications left behind by the nationalists during the Chinese Civil War in the post-World War II era, because the archipelago was the site of the Battle of Dachen Archipelago in the First Taiwan Strait Crisis.

See also
Yijiangshan Islands (Yikiangshan Islands)

References

External links
Tachen Islands Evacuation History
Pictures of the evacuation
Bank notes and brief history of Tachen between 1949 and 1955 

1955 in Taiwan
Islands of Zhejiang
Evacuations
Taizhou, Zhejiang
Islands of the East China Sea
Military history of Taiwan